The 12444 / 43 Anand Vihar–Haldia Superfast Express is a Superfast Express train belonging to Indian Railways – Northern Railway zone that runs between  and  in India .

It operates as train number 12444 from Anand Vihar Terminal to Haldia and as train number 12443 in the reverse direction, serving the states of Delhi, Uttar Pradesh, Bihar, Jharkhand and West Bengal.

Coaches

The 12444 / 43 Anand Vihar–Haldia Superfast Express has 1 AC 3 tier, 6 Sleeper class, 6 General Unreserved and 2 SLR (Seating cum Luggage Rake) coaches. It does not carry a pantry car  .

As is customary with most train services in India, coach composition may be amended at the discretion of Indian Railways depending on demand.

Service

As the average speed of the train is above , as per Indian Railways rules, its fare includes a Superfast surcharge.

Routeing

Traction

As the entire route is fully electrified, a Ghaziabad-based WAP-1  or WAP-4 powers the train for its entire journey.

Operation

12444 Anand Vihar–Haldia Superfast Express runs from Anand Vihar Terminal every Tuesday reaching Haldia the next day .i.e. Wednesday .

12443 Haldia–Anand Vihar Superfast Express runs from Haldia every Thursday reaching Anand Vihar Terminal the next day .i.e. Friday .

References 

 http://media2.intoday.in/indiatoday/images/railway-budget.pdf
 https://web.archive.org/web/20141021141029/http://www.nr.indianrailways.gov.in/view_detail.jsp?lang=0&dcd=2677&id=0,4,268
 https://www.youtube.com/watch?v=RbuHArKJypY
 http://zeenews.india.com/news/west-bengal/three-new-trains-flagged-off-in-kolkata_842265.html
 http://www.holidayiq.com/railways/anvt-hlz-s-f-ex-12444-train.html
 http://www.holidayiq.com/railways/hlz-anvt-wkly-s-12443-train.html

External links

Transport in Delhi
Rail transport in Delhi
Rail transport in Uttar Pradesh
Rail transport in Bihar
Rail transport in Jharkhand
Rail transport in West Bengal
Express trains in India
Railway services introduced in 2010
Transport in Haldia